Marks and Spencer Group plc (commonly abbreviated to M&S and colloquially known as Marks's or Marks & Sparks) is a major British multinational retailer with headquarters in Paddington, London that specialises in selling clothing, beauty, home products and food products. It is listed on the London Stock Exchange and is a constituent of the FTSE 250 Index; it had previously been in the FTSE 100 Index from its creation until 2019.

M&S was founded in 1884 by Michael Marks and Thomas Spencer in Leeds. M&S currently has 959 stores across the UK, including 615 that only sell food products and through its television advertising, asserts the exclusive nature and luxury of its food and beverages. It also offers an online food delivery service through a joint venture with Ocado.

In 1998, the company became the first British retailer to make a pre-tax profit of over £1 billion, although it then went into a sudden slump taking the company and its stakeholders by surprise. In November 2009, it was announced that Marc Bolland, formerly of Morrisons, would take over as chief executive from executive chairman Sir Stuart Rose in early 2010; Rose remained executive chairman until July 2010 and then chairman until January 2011, when he was replaced by Robert Swannell. In recent years, its clothing sales have fallen, whilst food sales have increased, after axing the St. Michael moniker for its own brand. The company also began to sell branded goods such as Kellogg's Corn Flakes in November 2008.

On 22 May 2018, it was confirmed that over 100 stores will have closed by 2022 in a "radical" plan. On 18 August 2020, M&S stated that they would cut 7,000 jobs over the next three months owing to the COVID-19 pandemic. In May 2021, the company announced plans to close another 30 shops over the next 10 years as part of its turnaround plan.

History

Establishment

The company was founded by a partnership between Michael Marks, a Polish Jew born in Slonim (now Belarus), who had migrated to Leeds, England in the early 1880s, and Thomas Spencer, a cashier from the English market town of Skipton in North Yorkshire. Marks worked for a company in Leeds called Barran, which employed Jewish migrants (see Sir John Barran, 1st Baronet). In 1884, he met Isaac Jowitt Dewhirst while looking for work. Dewhirst lent Marks £5, which he used to establish his penny bazaar on Kirkgate Market in Leeds. 

Dewhirst also taught him a little English. Dewhirst's cashier was Thomas Spencer, a bookkeeper, whose second wife, Agnes, helped improve Marks's English. In 1894, when Marks acquired a permanent stall in the Leeds covered market, he invited Spencer to become his partner.

In 1901, Marks moved to the Birkenhead open market in North West England, amalgamating his business with Spencer's. In 1903, the two men were allocated stall numbers 11 & 12 in the centre aisle; there they opened the penny bazaar. The company left Birkenhead Market on 24 February 1923.

The next few years saw Michael Marks and Tom Spencer move the original Leeds penny bazaar to 20, Cheetham Hill Road, Manchester, and they also opened market stalls in many locations around the North West of England.

Domestic growth

Marks and Spencer, known colloquially as "Marks and Sparks", or "M&S", made its reputation in the early 20th century with a policy of only selling British-made goods (it started to back down from this policy in the 1990s). It entered into long-term relationships with British manufacturers, and sold clothes and food under the "St Michael" brand, which was introduced in 1928. The brand honours Michael Marks. It also accepted the return of unwanted items, giving a full cash refund if the receipt was shown, no matter how long ago the product was purchased, which was unusual for the time.

M&S staff raised £5,000 to pay for a Supermarine Spitfire fighter aircraft called The Marksman in 1941.

By 1950, virtually all goods were sold under the "St Michael" label. M&S lingerie, women's clothes and girls' school uniform were branded under the "St Margaret" label until the whole range of general merchandise became "St Michael". Simon Marks, son of Michael Marks, died in 1964, after fifty-six years' service. Israel Sieff, the son-in-law of Michael Marks, took over as chairman and in 1968 John Salisse became the company Director. A cautious international expansion began with the introduction of Asian food in 1974. M&S opened stores in continental Europe in 1975 and in Ireland four years later.

The company put its main emphasis on quality, including a 1957 stocking size measuring system. In 1948 it established a Food Technology department.  Staff in the canteens and cafeterias had hygiene training by the mid 1950s. For most of its history, it also had a reputation for offering fair value for money. When this reputation began to waver, it encountered serious difficulties. Arguably, M&S has historically been an iconic retailer of 'British Quality Goods'.

The uncompromising attitude towards customer relations was summarised by the 1953 slogan: "The customer is always and completely right!"

Energy efficiency was improved by the addition of thermostatically controlled refrigerators in 1963.

M&S began selling Christmas cakes and Christmas puddings in 1958. In an effort to improve the quality of their Swiss rolls, they hired the food expert Nat Goldberg, who made a major improvement across their entire cake range, which had lost the public's favour a few years earlier. As a later measure to improve food quality, food labelling was improved and "sell by dates" were phased in between 1970 and 1972.

Smoking was banned from all M&S shops in 1959 because of the fire hazards it posed.

In 1972, Marcus Sieff became chairman, remaining in place until 1984, and emphasising the importance of good staff relations to the tradition of the store while extending staff benefits to areas such as restaurants and chiropody.

International expansion

Marks & Spencer expanded into Canada in 1973, and at one point had 47 stores. Despite efforts to improve its image, the chain was never able to move beyond its reputation there as a stodgy retailer, one that catered primarily to senior citizens and expatriate Britons. The shops in Canada were smaller than British outlets, and did not carry the same selection. In the late 1990s, further efforts were made to modernise them and also expand the customer base. Unprofitable locations were closed. Nevertheless the Canadian operations continued to lose money, and the last 38 shops in Canada were closed in 1999.

Expansion into France began with shops opening in Paris at Boulevard Haussmann and Lyon in 1975, followed by a second Paris shop at Rosny 2 in 1977. Further expansion into other French and Belgian cities followed into the 1980s. Although the Paris shops remained popular and profitable, the Western European operation as a whole did not fare as well and eighteen shops were sold in 2001. In April 2011, M&S changed direction again, with a plan to reopen a store that would not only sell clothing, but food as well. In addition, the group opened several food outlets throughout Paris. The first branch opened on 24 November 2011, on the Champs-Élysées in a ceremony attended by the company's CEO Marc Bolland, the model Rosie Huntington-Whiteley, and the British Ambassador to France, Sir Peter Westmacott.

In 1988, the company acquired Brooks Brothers, an American clothing company and Kings Super Markets, a US food chain.

21st century

Financial decline

M&S's profits peaked in the financial year 1997/1998. At the time it was seen as a continuing success story, but with hindsight it is considered that during Sir Richard Greenbury's tenure as head of the company, profit margins were pushed to untenable levels, and the loyalty of its customers was seriously eroded. Another factor was the company's refusal (until 2001) to accept any credit cards except for its own chargecard. These factors combined to send M&S into a sudden slump: its profits fell from more than a billion pounds in 1997 and 1998, to £145 million in the year ended 31 March 2001.

In 2002, with changes in its business focus such as accepting credit cards, the introduction of the "Per Una" clothing range designed by George Davies, and a redesign of its underlying business model, profits recovered somewhat. In 2004, M&S was in the throes of an attempted takeover by Arcadia Group and BHS boss, Philip Green. On 12 July a recovery plan was announced which would involve selling off its financial services business M&S Money to HSBC Bank, buying control of the Per Una range, closing the Gateshead Lifestore and stopping the expansion of its Simply Food line of shops. Philip Green withdrew his takeover bid after failing to get sufficient backing from shareholders.

In February 2007, M&S announced the opening of the world's largest M&S shop outside the UK at Dubai Festival City. On 2 October 2008, M&S opened its first mainland China shop which is in Shanghai. Problems with the supply chain for the first few months of opening led Stuart Rose, M&S chairman, to describe failures in "basic shopkeeping".

Restructuring

Twenty-two unprofitable and minor food stores, including branches in Ripon and Balham, were closed in early 2009 as part of a cost-cutting measure. In August 2010, it was confirmed that the Grantham branch of M&S would close, along with two other Lincolnshire branches in Skegness and Scunthorpe, owing to low sales in these older format stores. These decisions met with protests from the local communities and petitions were signed in support of retaining the stores, although the closures went ahead.

The Retail Knowledge Bank conducted an audit of the company's brands in August 2010, and revealed that sales of womenswear were at a 10-year low. Drapers magazine claimed that Per Una was the only clothing brand not at risk of being axed while Marc Bolland, the chief executive, considered which brands would be retained.

On 9 November 2010, Bolland revealed plans to strengthen the company's overall brand image and targeting sales of between £800 million and £1 billion for which company will increase capital expenditure to £850 million to £900 million over the next three years to fund the plans. The plan also involved the discontinuation of its 'Portfolio' fashion brand and the sale of electrical products. The company announced a new marketing strapline, 'Only at M&S', and that it would revamp its website. Bolland ordered a new store design in May 2011, and it was announced that the company would spend around £600 million between 2011 and 2014 on its UK stores.

In May 2013, the Best of British range was launched along with an overhaul of Per Una and Indigo. Patrick Bousquet-Chavanne became the marketing director, succeeding Steven Sharp in July. Bolland vowed to bring "quality and style back". In November 2013, it was revealed that Bill Adderley, founder of homeware chain Dunelm Group, had built a £250 million stake in M&S over the past 18 months. This disclosure was made under stock market rules which require any holding larger than a 3 per cent share to be made public.

On 7 January 2016, it was announced that Marc Bolland, who has been CEO since 2010, would step down on 2 April 2016, and be replaced by Steve Rowe, head of clothing, and previously head of the food business. In 2018, Stuart Machin was appointed Managing Director of Food to lead the transformation of the food business.

Store culls
Some 30 stores were identified for closure in 2015-2016. Several smaller stores were identified for closure in November 2017. On 31 January 2018, another fourteen stores were identified for closure in April 2018. Meanwhile, eight other stores were earmarked for closure at a later date, pending consultation. On 23 May 2018, M&S managers confirmed that 14 more shops were to be closed and another 86 were under investigation, and thus put on notice, because of falling corporate sales and customer footfall. This would take the total to over 100 closing by 2022, On 15 January 2019, the company named the next wave of 17 stores earmarked for closure. In May 2021, the company announced plans to close another 30 shops over the next 10 years as part of its turnaround plan, and in September 2021 it was confirmed that half of the French stores had been closed due to supply chain issues arising from Brexit.

In March 2021, M&S announced it intended to redevelop its largest store, the Marble Arch branch on Oxford Street in London, replacing it with a 10-storey building with two-and-a-half floors of shop space below several floors of offices. Despite protests from groups including Save Britain's Heritage, The Twentieth Century Society and Create Streets, the plans were approved by Westminster City Council in November 2021, and Mayor of London Sadiq Khan chose not to intervene. However, in April 2022, Communities Secretary Michael Gove blocked the plans to allow time for the Department for Levelling Up, Housing and Communities to review the proposed redevelopment. In June 2022, Gove ordered a public enquiry into the plans; M&S said it was "bewildered and disappointed" by his "baseless" decision. A two-week planning enquiry, set to open on 25 October 2022, would look at whether the project complies with planning rules concerning heritage and the historic environment and also address environmental concerns, notably the release of almost 40,000 tonnes of embodied carbon into the atmosphere caused by the construction of the replacement structure.

New management
In May 2021, Stuart Machin's remit expanded as he was appointed joint Chief Operating Officer taking oversight responsibility for Store and Central Operations, Property, Store Development, Technology, People and the Island of Ireland whilst remaining the Food Managing Director. In March 2022, it was announced that chief executive (CEO) Steve Rowe would step down after six years in role. Rowe stayed on as an advisor before officially leaving the company in July 2022. Stuart Machin was announced as his successor as CEO, with Katie Bickerstaffe assisting as co-CEO.

Recent history
In July 2022, the company agreed to buy the logistics firm Gist Limited for £145 million. In November 2022, it was reported that the company had acquired the intellectual property developed by collapsed fashion marketplace Thread, and hired some former Thread staff including co-founder Kieran O'Neill, with the aim of adding personalised recommendations to the M&S website.

Archives
The M&S company archive is held in the Michael Marks Building at the University of Leeds. The archive has permanent museum-style displays and hosts temporary exhibitions.

Corporate affairs

Head office locations

The headquarters of M&S had been since 1957 at Michael House, 55 Baker Street, London. This had formerly been the Baker Street Bazaar which had been destroyed in a fire in 1940. The site was redeveloped by M&S, under the direction of the then Sir Simon Marks, as the company had outgrown its previous Bayswater HQ. In 2004, the company moved to a new headquarters designed by Mossessian & Partners at Waterside House, in Paddington Basin, London.

As well as the main offices in London, there are a number of other head office sites across the UK; Stockley Park (IT Services), Salford Quays (Marks & Spencer Shared Services Ltd. which provides human resources, and finance administration) and Chester (HSBC's M&S Money and Retail Customer Services).

The company has overseas sourcing offices in Malaysia, Hong Kong, Thailand, India, Bangladesh, Turkey, China, Ireland, Italy, Indonesia, and Sri Lanka.

Financial performance
Financial performance has been as follows:
Until 1999 M&S's financial year ended on 31 March. Since then, the company has changed to reporting for 52- or 53-week periods, ending on variable dates.

Social and environmental policy

"Look Behind the Label"
In 2006, the Look Behind the Label marketing campaign was introduced. The aim of this campaign was to highlight to customers the various ethical and environmentally friendly aspects of the production and sourcing methods engaged in by M&S including: Fairtrade products, sustainable fishing and environmentally friendly textile dyes. All coffee and tea sold in M&S stores is now Fairtrade. In addition, the company offers clothing lines made from Fairtrade cotton in selected departments.

On 15 January 2007, M&S launched an initiative known as "Plan A", to dramatically increase the environmental sustainability of the business within five years and expected to cost £200 million.

The plan covers "100 commitments over five years to address the key social and environmental challenges facing M&S today and in the future" with the tag-line "Because there is no Plan B". The commitments span five themes: climate change, waste, sustainable raw materials, 'fair partnership' and health, with the aim that, by 2012, it will:
 Become carbon neutral
 Send no waste to landfill
 Extend sustainable sourcing
 Help improve the lives of people in their supply chain
 Help customers and employees live a healthier life-style

Despite an 18% fall in the share price in January 2008, following the publication of their latest trading statement, the company confirmed that they would be continuing with the plan, saying that there were 'compelling commercial—as well as moral—reasons to do so'.

M&S introduced a reusable hessian bag in 2007 as part of the plan, aiming to reduce the number of plastic bags used within five years. This was followed in May 2008 by the introduction of a 5p charge for standard sized carrier bags used for food purchases (before this charge became compulsory). All profits from the sale of food bags originally went to the charity Groundwork UK; M&S launched the "Forever Fish" campaign in June 2011 and switched funding to that campaign to promote protection of marine wildlife in the UK.

While becoming carbon neutral the company has committed to use carbon offsetting only as a last resort, restricted to cases "where it is required by government or where the technology for green air or road transport will not be available for the foreseeable future".

As of August 2008, M&S had three wind turbines in operation, one at Methlick and two near Strichen, which generate enough power to supply three stores via the National Grid. In April 2009 the company began purchasing 2.6 TWh of renewable energy (wind and hydroelectric) from Npower, enough to power all Marks & Spencer stores and offices in England and Wales.

In 2012 the company was awarded European Business Award for the Environment (Management category) by the European Union for Plan A.

Charity work
M&S has sold a wide range of charitable women's clothes for Breakthrough Breast Cancer for many years and the Ashbourne store collected a total of £2,000 for a local hospital's new ECG machine in 2010. In 2011 M&S launched a clothes recycling initiative in partnership with Oxfam.

In 2015, M&S partnered with community investment platform Neighbourly to help them distribute unsold surplus food and non-food items to small charities and community groups in the UK and Ireland. In March 2020, M&S made a £100,000 donation to the Neighbourly Community Fund and a £100,000 donation to the National Emergencies Trust Coronavirus Appeal to help communities affected by the COVID-19 pandemic.

Senior management
The following have served as the Chairman of the company since it was founded:
 1884–1907: Michael Marks (set up first stall in Leeds in 1884)
 1907–1916: William Chapman
 1916–1964: Simon Marks (Lord Marks)
 1964–1967: Israel Sieff (Lord Sieff)
 1967–1972: Edward Sieff
 1972–1984: Marcus Sieff (Lord Sieff)
 1984–1991: Derek Rayner (Lord Rayner)
 1991–1999: Sir Richard Greenbury
 2000–2004: Luc Vandevelde
 2004–2006: Paul Myners
 2006–2009: Lord Burns
 2009–2011: Sir Stuart Rose
 2011–2017: Robert Swannell
 2017–present: Archie Norman

Stores

UK and Ireland

The second largest is in Cheshire Oaks, Ellesmere Port, which is the largest store outside of London. The third largest shop is at the Gemini Retail Park in Warrington. In 1999 M&S opened its shop in Manchester's Exchange Square, which was destroyed in the 1996 Manchester bombing and rebuilt. The smallest branch is a 'Marks & Spencer Penny Bazaar' clearance outlet located in the Grainger Market in Newcastle upon Tyne.

M&S has opened a number of stores at out of town locations since a trend to build shopping centres away from town centres became popular in the 1980s. The first was at the MetroCentre, Gateshead, Tyne and Wear, which opened in 1986. Another notable example is the store at the Merry Hill Shopping Centre at Brierley Hill, West Midlands. This store opened on 23 October 1990 shortly after the closure of stores in the nearby town centres of Dudley and West Bromwich; the Merry Hill store was not originally intended to replace these two town centre stores, but both the Dudley and West Bromwich stores had experienced a downturn in trade as the opening of the Merry Hill store loomed, and both stores were closed on 25 August 1990.

Before Christmas 2006, twenty-two M&S shops were open for 24-hour trading including stores at Bolton, Middlebrook and at the Abbey Centre, Newtownabbey, Northern Ireland.

In the Republic of Ireland, the company operates 17 stores employing 2,000 employees. Irish stores stock a range of Irish branded M&S products and M&S products part of its global network. As of September 2021, M&S Ireland stores are restructuring their product line for the Irish market due to EU-UK trade issues, with up to 800 products due to be dropped in Ireland. Furthermore, M&S Ireland confirmed it will increase the amount of Irish goods stocked at its stores.

International

The company reopened its store in Paris on 24 November 2011, following the launch of a new French website on 11 October 2011. In the Philippines, the Rustans Group of Companies serves as the official franchise partner and operates a total of 18 M&S shops, the largest of which is located in Greenbelt Mall. A new store opened on 17 April 2013 in Kalverstraat in Amsterdam, Netherlands, more than 10 years after closure of the previous store. On 17 September 2013 the British ambassador to the Netherlands, Sir Geoffrey Adams, opened the first Dutch Marks & Spencer Food pilot store at a BP petrol station in Bijleveld beside the A12 motorway. There are over 300 stores in some 40 overseas locations.

On 11 November 2013, Marks & Spencer announced "that it is set to have about 80 stores open in the region by 2016 as part of its strategy to become a leading international, multichannel retailer" with partner Reliance Retail. It opened a flagship store in Bandra in Mumbai. M&S sales of lingerie accounts for more than a fifth of the sales in the Indian market, with total lingerie sales increasing by a third during the last six months of 2013.  In May 2014 Marks & Spencer announced that their intention was now to open 100 stores in the country by 2016.

In the Netherlands, as of 2015, M&S had a supermarket in the expensive Kalverstraat shopping street in Amsterdam, as well as a larger store including clothing in The Hague. A number of BP petrol stations in the Western area of the Netherlands included M&S convenience food stores. In 2016, M&S was due to open a much larger store in Amsterdam, with a direct underground link to a new metro station. However, in November 2016 the company announced that they were closing all of their stores on the European mainland, something that did not actually happen. Nevertheless, they closed both of their stores in the Netherlands.

Marks & Spencer owns 51 stores in Turkey as of 2022. Fiba Retail is the sole agent authorized to open Marks & Spencer stores in Turkey and Ukraine region.

Stores in the territories of Hong Kong and Macau were sold in early 2018 to Al-Futtaim Group, a Dubai-based long-term franchise partner.

In September 2021, M&S confirmed the closure of 11 stores in France and ended its partnership with SFH, saying it was "near impossible for us to serve fresh and chilled products to customers" following the UK's exit from the European Union. The company would still operate nine smaller stores in or near major travel hubs.

Store formats

Full line stores
M&S core shops typically feature a selection of the company's clothing, homeware and beauty ranges and an M&S Foodhall (formerly Simply Food). The range of clothing sold and the space given to it depends on the location and customer demographic (an example would be that some London shops do not stock the Classic Collection, but stock Limited Edition and a full Autograph range). Select locations feature an M&S Café. The current store format was designed by Urban Salon Architects in 2009.

Food hall (in-store)
All the St Michael Food hall supermarkets were renamed M&S Food hall when Marks & Spencer dropped the St Michael brand in 2003. Each M&S Foodhall sells groceries, which historically were all under the Marks & Spencer brand. However, in 2006 the company began selling a limited range of other brands, such as Coca-Cola and Stella Artois, without reducing the number of M&S goods they sold. This marked the first time in its 125-year history that Marks & Spencer had sold any brands other than its own.

M&S introduced self-checkout tills in the food halls of a small number of trial stores in 2002. Self-service checkouts were implemented in the general merchandise sections in three trial stores in 2006.

In 2019, M&S launched five new Food renewal stores. This was part of the transformation of the Food business, led by Managing Director Stuart Machin, to have bigger Food stores with "the mind of a supermarket and the soul of a fresh market".

Home stores
In 2007, M&S announced that new, dedicated shops for home furnishings were to be launched. Shops have been opened in Cheltenham in Gloucestershire, Tunbridge Wells in Kent, Lisburn Sprucefield in Northern Ireland, and in the Barton Square section of The Trafford Centre, Manchester.

Outlet stores
The outlet division offers M&S products, with the majority of them discounted at least 30% from the original selling price. The first of these stores opened at Ashford in Kent in 2000, and by 2020 there were 25. Many of the outlet shops are in retail parks and outlet centres, although others are high street shops such as the one in Woolwich, South London.

M&S Foodhall (standalone)

M&S launched a convenience format, branded Simply Food in 2001, with the first stores opening in Twickenham and Surbiton. The stores predominantly sell food, although some larger stores also stock a small selection of general merchandise. A number of these are run under franchise agreements:
 SSP Group runs the stores at mainline railway stations and airports.
 Moto has stores at many of its motorway service areas.
 BP has petrol stations with Simply Food offerings.

Orders from M&S accounted for more than half of Uniq's food product supplies to UK retailers in 2010, after several years' service as a major M&S food product supplier.

In 2011 it was noted that M&S were operating express pricing; i.e., charging more in their Simply Food branches than in regular branches. A spokesperson stated that "prices are a little higher than at our high street stores but this reflects the fact that these stores are open longer and are highly convenient for customers on the move".

The Simply Food brand was phased out in stand-alone larger stores after the rebrand in 2015 and the stores are now branded as "M&S Foodhall."

M&S also lowered the price of over 1000 of their popular lines to compete with their larger supermarket rivals such as Tesco and Sainsbury's.

Online services
Online food deliveries began with trials in 2017. In 2019 M&S bought 50% of Ocado Retail Ltd, and since 2020 customers are directed to Ocado's website where they can order food and selected clothing items.

The online flower service was accused of unfair trading and using Google to piggy-back advertise on online searches aimed at Interflora online in 2010.

Other services
In addition to the main retail business, M&S partners with other companies to provide additional M&S-branded services: 
 M&S Bank – financial services and credit products, operated by HSBC UK
 M&S Energy – domestic gas and electricity supply, operated by Octopus Energy
 M&S Opticians – operated by Owl Optical

Product line history

The "St Michael" brand was introduced by Simon Marks in 1928 in honour of his father and co-founder of Marks & Spencer, Michael Marks. By 1950, virtually all goods were sold under the St Michael brand. M&S lingerie, women's clothing and girls' uniform were branded under the St Margaret brand, until the whole range of general merchandise became St Michael. Marks & Spencer were selling clothes under the St Margaret and St Michael label by the mid-1950s and launched their school uniforms in the early 1950s.

The synthetic fibre Tricell was first used in 1957 and lasted until the 1970s. and another synthetic fibre called Courtelle was first launched, nationally, by Marks & Spencer during 1960 and also lasted well into the 1970s. Machine washable wool first appeared in 1972 and Lycra hosiery first came in during 1986.

"Per Una" was launched on 28 September 2001 as a joint venture between M&S and Next founder George Davies with the contribution of Julie Strang. The Per Una brand has been a major success for the company, and in October 2004, M&S bought the brand in a £125 million, two-year service contract with George Davies. Davies was to stay on for at least two years to run the company, with 12 months notice required if he wished to leave.

In 2004, Sir Stuart Rose axed a number of brands including the menswear brand "SP Clothing", the "View From" sportswear range, the David Beckham children's range "DB07" and several food lines as he thought the company's stock inventory management had become 'too complicated'. A version of Per Una aimed at teenagers, "Per Una Due", was also discontinued, despite having launched earlier in the year, owing to poor sales.

The company also began to sell branded goods like Kellogg's Corn Flakes in November 2008. Following a review by Marc Bolland in 2011, M&S confirmed it would begin to reduce the number of branded items on sale, instead offering only those that it did not have an M&S alternative for.

In January 2021, Marks & Spencer purchased the Jaeger fashion brand from its administrators. The £5 million deal was part of the firm's strategy to boost its clothing division with new names. However, it did not include Jaeger's 63 shops and 13 concessions.

Marketing

Early 2000s

During the height of the company's troubles at the beginning of the 21st century, the St Michael brand used as the selling label for all M&S products was discontinued in favour of Marks & Spencer and a new logo in the Optima typeface was introduced and began to appear in place of St Michael on product packaging. The same logo was also applied to store fascias and carrier bags. The St Michael name was subsequently adopted as a 'quality guarantee' and appeared as the St Michael Quality Promise on the back of food products, on the side of delivery vehicles and on in-store ordering receipts.

Your M&S

When Steve Sharp joined as marketing director in 2004, after being hired by Stuart Rose, he introduced a new promotional brand under the Your M&S banner, with a corresponding logo.

High-profile media campaigns

M&S has run newspaper and/or magazine advertisements since the early 1950s, but the introduction of some famous stars including Twiggy and David Jason in TV ads helped raise the company's profile. Twiggy first appeared in 1967, returning later in 1995 and 2005. Anne Grierson featured in advertisements during the late 1950s and most of the 1960s. In later years, Erin O'Connor, Myleene Klass, David Beckham, Antonio Banderas, Claudia Schiffer, Helena Christensen, Tatjana Patitz, Lisa Snowdon, Dannii Minogue, V V Brown, and Carmen Kass have featured in advertisements. John Sergeant, David Jason and Joanna Lumley have either appeared in or voiced over advertisements since 2008.

Advertisements from the 2000s had the tag-line "This is not just food, this is M&S food" and featured slow motion, close-up footage of various food products, described in a sultry voice-over by Dervla Kirwan, to an enticing instrumental song — including Fleetwood Mac's "Albatross" as well as Santana's "Samba Pa Ti", Olly Murs' "Busy", Groove Armada's "At the River" or Spandau Ballet's "True". These advertisements were referred to by some sections of the media as food porn, with a number of other companies copying the idea, such as Aldi and, subsequently, Waitrose.

The 2009 TV advertising campaign drew complaints, leading to national press coverage, regarding sexism.

In 2010, it was confirmed that Dannii Minogue would be one of the new faces of Marks & Spencer. She filmed her first commercial in South Africa, which featured Cheryl Lynn's "Got to Be Real", for their Spring campaign that aired on 24 March. In August 2011, M&S announced the new faces of their campaigns would be Rosie Huntington-Whiteley, Ryan Reynolds, and David Gandy.

Marks & Spencer released a series of planned television adverts in July 2011, featuring Twiggy, Minogue and VV Brown, as it started its corporate image revamp. It confirmed that Twiggy, Lisa Snowden, and Jamie Redknapp would return for future advertising.

On 31 March 2014, M&S launched the new iteration of its 'Leading Ladies' marketing campaign featuring Emma Thompson, Annie Lennox, Rita Ora and Baroness Lawrence.

Digital marketing
Marks & Spencer announced its Technology Transformation Programme in 2018 focusing on business growth using digital marketing.

Criticism and controversies

Anti-Israel protests
Marks & Spencer has been repeatedly targeted and boycotted by anti-Israel protestors during the Arab League boycott of Israel. In 2014, it was reported that the Marble Arch branch was picketed weekly by protesters objecting to the sale of Israeli goods.

Comprehensive Spending Review

In October 2010, chairman Sir Stuart Rose was a signatory to a controversial letter to The Daily Telegraph which claimed that "The private sector should be more than capable of generating additional jobs to replace those lost in the public sector, and the redeployment of people to more productive activities will improve economic performance, so generating more employment opportunities", despite recent job cuts of 1,000 staff.

Contactless payment issues
Some Marks & Spencer customers claim that the chain's contactless payment terminals have taken money from cards other than the ones intended for payment. Contactless cards are supposed to be within about 4 cm of the front of the terminal to work. M&S investigated the incident and confirmed the new system had been extensively tested and was robust. It had recently rolled out the contactless payments system, provided by Visa Europe, to 644 UK stores.

Muslim checkout-staff policy
In December 2013, Marks & Spencer announced that Muslim checkout staff in the UK could refuse to sell pork products or alcohol to customers at their till. The policy was announced after at least one news outlet reported that customers waiting with goods that included pork or alcohol were refused service, and were told by a Muslim checkout worker to wait until another till became available. The policy applied across all 703 UK M&S stores and prompted a strong backlash by customers.

A company spokesman subsequently apologised and stated that they will attempt to reassign staff whose beliefs may impact their work to different departments, such as clothing.

Hijab as school uniform
Marks & Spencer introduced a hijab in its section of school uniforms in late 2018 and subsequently faced a backlash and boycott from some customers; the product is stocked for girls as young as three.

Holly Willoughby
In September 2018, television presenter and model Holly Willoughby became the company's new brand ambassador along with her 'Must Have' collection which launched on 27 September 2018. However, the company failed to order sufficient stock and many customers were left disappointed.

Arms

References

Bibliography

External links

 
 Plan A eco-initiative
 

 
1884 establishments in England
British brands
British companies established in 1884
Clothing retailers of the United Kingdom
Companies listed on the London Stock Exchange
Department stores of Serbia
Department stores of Singapore
Department stores of the United Kingdom
Fashion design
Food retailers of the United Kingdom
Retail companies established in 1884
Supermarkets of Northern Ireland
Supermarkets of the United Kingdom
Retail companies based in London